The 2014 AFC Champions League Final was the final of the 2014 AFC Champions League, the 33rd edition of the top-level Asian club football tournament organized by the Asian Football Confederation (AFC), and the 12th under the current AFC Champions League title.

The final was contested in two-legged home-and-away format between Australian team Western Sydney Wanderers and Saudi Arabian team Al-Hilal. The first leg was hosted by Western Sydney Wanderers at Parramatta Stadium in Sydney on 25 October 2014, while the second leg was hosted by Al-Hilal at the King Fahd International Stadium in Riyadh on 1 November 2014. This was the first AFC Champions League final involving an Australian club since Adelaide United in 2008, as well as the first to not involve a South Korean representative since the said final. 

Western Sydney Wanderers won the match 1–0 on aggregate to become the first Australian team to win the trophy. Wanderers also earned the right to represent the AFC at the 2014 FIFA Club World Cup, entering at the quarter-finals.

Qualified teams

Venues

The 2014 AFC Champions League Final is contested in two-legged home-and-away format, held at the home of both finalists. It is the second consecutive year that the AFC adopted such an arrangement, following the success of the 2013 AFC Champions League Final.

Western Sydney Wanderers' home venue, Parramatta Stadium, is a 21,500 seated stadium located in the city of Sydney. The stadium was chosen in preference to the 45,500 seated Sydney Football Stadium and 84,000 seated Stadium Australia. Although the experience during the final was widely praised, the stadium was built in 1985, and the lack of modern facilities saw the Wanderers lobby the NSW Government to replace the stadium with a new one, as an example, because VIP patrons were kept waiting for elevators to their corporate boxes. The stadium was demolished in February 2017 and replaced on the same site by the Western Sydney Stadium.

Only one previous final has been held in Australia. In the second leg of the 2008 final, Adelaide United was defeated by Gamba Osaka 0–2 in Hindmarsh Stadium in the city of Adelaide. Gamba Osaka eventually claimed the title 5–0 on aggregate.

Al-Hilal's home venue, King Fahd International Stadium, is a 61,781 seated stadium located in the capital city of Riyadh. It is also the home ground of several other Saudi Premier League clubs.

In the history of the competition, seven finals have been held in Saudi Arabia and this final was the fifth that Riyadh hosted. The first final hosted by a Saudi Arabian city was the first ever Asian final, the 1985–86 Asian Club Championship, which was won by South Korean side Daewoo Royals 3–1 against Al-Ahli in the city of Jeddah. The next two consecutive finals, the 1986 and second leg of the 1987, were hosted in the Riyadh. The 1986 final was won by Japanese side Furukawa Electric, with Al-Hilal finishing runners-up. The 1987 final was awarded to Yomiuri FC after a walkover by Al-Hilal. Eight years later, Al-Nassr hosted the 1995 final, when Ilhwa Chunma won the match 1–0 in the King Fahd International Stadium. Al-Hilal brought the final back to Riyadh for the 1999–2000 final, in which the club won 3–2 against Japanese side Júbilo Iwata. The first leg of the 2004 final saw Al-Ittihad lose to South Korean side Seongnam Ilhwa Chunma 1–3 in the Prince Abdullah Al Faisal Stadium (6–3 on aggregate). The second leg of the 2005 final returned to Al-Ittihad's home, when the club was crowned Asian Champions after a 4–2 thrashing of United Arab Emirates side Al-Ain (5–3 on aggregate).

Background
Al-Hilal have made 21 appearances in continental football and been crowned champions of Asia on two occasions, in the 1991 and the 1999–2000 edition of the tournament. The 2014 Champions League was Western Sydney Wanderers first appearance in continental football, with the club only established in 2012.

Both clubs qualified directly to the Champions League group stage through their respective leagues; Al-Hilal finished second in the 2012–13 Saudi Professional League and Western Sydney Wanderers ended their first ever season of competition (the 2012–13 A-League) as league winners.

In the lead-up to the 2014 Champions League both finalists had strong seasons, with both clubs finishing second in their respective leagues (Al-Hilal in the 2013–14 Saudi Professional League and Western Sydney Wanderers in the 2013–14 A-League). Al-Hilal also managed to reach the quarter-finals of the 2014 King Cup of Champions where they were eliminated, and Western Sydney Wanderers reached the 2014 A-League Grand Final which they eventually lost in extra time.

The clubs began competing in the Champions League group stage in February 2014 during mid-season in their domestic competitions, and they continued in the tournament after the end of the 2013–14 football seasons in Australia and Saudi Arabia due to the calendar format of the Asian tournament. For Al-Hilal, the 2014–15 Saudi Professional League started in early August before the resumption of the Champions League quarter-finals, while for the Western Sydney Wanderers, the 2014–15 A-League started in early October, after the Champions League semi-finals and before the final.

Prior to the final, Al-Hilal coach Laurențiu Reghecampf dismissed the Wanderers as "a small team", and frequently promised that Al-Hilal would win the title.

Road to the final

Note: In all results below, the score of the finalist is given first (H: home; A: away).

Rules
The final was played on a home-and-away two-legged basis, with the order of legs decided by draw. The away goals rule, extra time (away goals do not apply in extra time) and penalty shoot-out were used to decide the winner if necessary.

Match details

First leg

Team selection

Summary
The first leg was hosted by Western Sydney Wanderers at Parramatta Stadium in Sydney on 25 October 2014.

The game started in a manner that did not reflect the eventual result. Moments after kick off Alfaraj broke into the area on the left flank but couldn't find a team-mate and Western Sydney cleared the ball behind for a corner. Al-Hilal dominated possession and the chances but couldn't find any cracks in the Wanderers defensive armour. Moments before half-time Al Hilal had their best chance of the night after a defensive clearance smashed into Mateo Poljak's face and rebounded for the benefit of Al-Hilal, with Alshamrani being played through on goal but skying his shot.

Supersub Tomi Juric came on in the 58th minute and it took him all of 6 minutes to make his mark on the final, a peach of a cross from Antony Golec on the left wing found Juric up front, the number 9 connecting with a right boot that saw the ball slide under Abdullah Mohammed Al Sudairy to give the Wanderers a priceless goal. Golec later described it as the best cross in his entire career.

As the clock ticked past the 70 minute mark Juric nearly had a brace, he picked up the ball after Digao over-ran it, and Juric went on a mazy run at the defence. Juric opened up enough space for a placed shot from the edge of the penalty area, which beat the keeper but not the woodwork, the ball bouncing away from the path of Mark Bridge who would have been faced with a tap-in.

Al-Hilal had the better of the match but lacked a truly cutting edge and it proved to be their downfall. Without an away goal to show for their trip, the Wanderers will win the Champions League trophy with a win or draw at the King Fahd International Stadium in Riyadh. If the Wanderers can continue their streak of scoring in away ACL matches their opponents will need at least three goals to win the tie.

Details

Statistics

Reactions

Second leg

Team selection

Summary
The second leg was hosted by Al-Hilal at the King Fahd International Stadium in Riyadh on 1 November 2014. 

In the 18th minute Al Hilal had the first chance of the game, swinging a free kick from the left flank that the Wanderers weren't able to get anything on, thankfully for them neither did one of their opponents, a right boot stuck out but agonisingly distant from making contact.

A minute before half-time the first penalty shout of the night was waved away by Japanese referee Yuichi Nishimura. Inside the area a ball rolled into the path of the flying Nawaf Al-Abed, Antony Golec clipped the right foot of the attacker but the theatrical leap perhaps weighed the incidence in the favour of the Australians.

After the break it was another stonewall penalty turned down, Salman Al-Faraj latching onto a through ball deep in the right corner of the penalty area and was clearly brought down by Ante Covic but wasn't punished for the indiscretion. Another potential penalty came when the ball was kicked at short range into arms of Brendon Santalab, Nishimura judging that it was ball to hand rather than hand to ball.

The Saudi's pushed on and on, pressing for a goal that would take the game into extra time, and it looked for all money like they had one in the 84th minute. A cutback found talismanic striker Yasser Al-Qahtani, his shot from near the penalty spot had no right to be saved but the big hand of Covic found a way. The ball bounced once before spinning out for a corner just inches away from the goalpost. The save was the biggest moment for an Australian keeper since Mark Schwarzer in the famous shootout against Uruguay.

The Wanderers had precious little attack of their own, the best chance coming from a mazy Vítor Saba dribble that released Labinot Haliti, the shot being blocked desperately. Western Sydney didn't need a goal however, an eventual 6 minutes of injury time passed before the final whistle blew and the Wanderers were officially crowned Champions of Asia.

Details

Statistics

Reactions
Western Sydney Wanderers coach, Tony Popovic, spoke after the match about the win, saying "we were called a small club yesterday, today we are the biggest in Asia."

References

External links
AFC Champions League, the-AFC.com

Final
2014
2014 in Australian soccer
2014–15 in Saudi Arabian football
Western Sydney Wanderers FC matches
Al Hilal SFC matches
International club association football competitions hosted by Australia
International club association football competitions hosted by Saudi Arabia